Kian Ronan (born 9 March 2001) is an English-born Gibraltarian footballer who plays as a defender or midfielder for Lincoln Red Imps and the Gibraltar national team.

Club career

Youth career 
Ronan played his youth football at Ipswich Town, and made two appearances in the 2018–19 FA Youth Cup.

Senior career

Loan to Mildenhall Town 
On 14 November 2018, Ronan joined Isthmian League North team Mildenhall Town on loan.

Manchester 62 
In 2019, Ronan joined Gibraltar National League team Manchester 62.

Lincoln Red Imps 
On 8 July 2020, he signed with giants Lincoln Red Imps.

International career 
Ronan has represented Gibraltar at various youth levels.

Ronan made his international debut for Gibraltar on 5 September 2020 in the UEFA Nations League against San Marino.

Career statistics

International

Honours
Lincoln Red Imps
Gibraltar National League: 2020–21

References

External links
 
 
 

2001 births
Living people
Sportspeople from Harlow
Gibraltarian footballers
Gibraltar youth international footballers
Gibraltar under-21 international footballers
Gibraltar international footballers
English footballers
English people of Gibraltarian descent
Association football defenders
Association football midfielders
Lincoln Red Imps F.C. players
Manchester 62 F.C. players
Mildenhall Town F.C. players